Nyekak can refer to two types of durians:

Durio kutejensis, which uses it as a common name
The DQ2 nyekak (DK8) variety of Durio graveolens